Africalpe vagabunda is a moth of the family Erebidae first described by Charles Swinhoe in 1884. It is found in Pakistan and Egypt.

References

Calpinae
Moths of Asia
Moths of Africa
Moths described in 1884